KHUN (107.1 FM) was a radio station licensed to Huntington, Utah, United States. The station was owned by College Creek Media, LLC.

On September 30, 2013, the Federal Communications Commission (FCC) notified the licensee that KHUN's license had expired effective July 6, 2012, as the station had been silent for the preceding twelve months. The FCC simultaneously deleted the KHUN call sign from its data base.

References

External links
 

HUN
Defunct radio stations in the United States
Radio stations disestablished in 2013
2013 disestablishments in Utah
HUN